Palitana is one of the 182 Legislative Assembly constituencies of Gujarat state in India. It is part of Bhavnagar district.

List of segments 
This assembly seat represents the following segments,

 Palitana Taluka
 Sihor Taluka (Part) Villages – Agiyali, Ambla, Amargadh, Bekdi, Bhankhal, Bhutiya, Bordi, Budhana, Chorvadala, Devgana, Dhankan Kunda, Dhundhsar, Gadhula (?Gadhoola), Gundala, Ishvariya, Jambala, Kanad, Karmadiya, Khari, Lavarda, Limbaddhar, Madhada, Malvan, Meghvadar, Nava Jaliya, Panch Talavada, Panchvada, Padapan, Piparadi, Piparala, Rajpara, Ramdhari, Ratanpar, Sakhvadar, Sandhida, Sanosara, Sarkadia (Tana), Sarkadiya (Songadh), Sarvedi, Tana, Tarakpaldi, Thala, Thorali, Toda Todi, Varal, Vavdi (Gajabhai), Vavdi (Vachhani), Zariya

Members of Legislative Assembly

Election candidate

2022

Election results

2017

2012

2007

2002

See also 
 List of constituencies of Gujarat Legislative Assembly
 Gujarat Legislative Assembly

References

External links
 

Assembly constituencies of Gujarat
Bhavnagar district